The  (Illuminated) was a term used to loosely describe practitioners of a mystical form of Christianity in Spain during the 15th-16th centuries. Some  were only mildly heterodox, but others held views that were clearly heretical, according to the contemporary rulers. Consequently, they were firmly repressed and became some of the early victims of the Spanish Inquisition.

Background
The historian Marcelino Menéndez y Pelayo found the name as early as 1492 (in the form , 1498), and traced the group to a Gnostic origin. He thought their views were promoted in Spain through influences from Italy.

Beliefs
The  held that the human soul can reach such a degree of perfection that it can even in the present life contemplate the essence of God and comprehend the mystery of the Trinity. All external worship, they declared, is superfluous, the reception of the sacraments useless, and sin impossible in this state of complete union with God. Persons in this state of impeccability could indulge their sexual desires and commit other sinful acts freely without staining their souls.

After each proposition were given the grounds on which it was judged heretical. Among the odder of these propositions are that it is a mortal sin to read a book to console one's soul (No. 31), which the Inquisition's theologians described as "crazy, erroneous, and even heretical"; and that one sinned mortally every time one loved a son, daughter, or other person, and did not love that person through God (No. 36), which the theologians said was "erroneous and false, and against the common teaching of the saints". One , seeing a girl cross the street, said that "she had sinned, because in that action she had fulfilled her will" (No. 40). The theologians commented: "The foundation of this proposition is heretical, because it seems to state that all action that proceeds from our will is sin."

Historical cases
A labourer's daughter known as La Beata de Piedrahita, born in Salamanca, came to the notice of the Inquisition in 1511, by claiming to hold colloquies with Jesus and the Virgin Mary; some high patronage saved her from a rigorous denunciation. She is often, as The Catholic Encyclopedia cautiously notes, "cited as an early adherent" of the ' errors, though "it is not certain that she was guilty of heresy". Some  scholarslike the Dominican historian and theologian Álvaro Huergatake a relatively favorable view of her. They question on chronological and other grounds the tendency to associate her with the  movement, seeing her rather as "pre-".

Henry Charles Lea, in his A History of the Inquisition in Spain, mentions, among the more extravagant , a priest from Seville named Fernando Méndez, who had acquired a special reputation for sanctity: "he taught his disciples to invoke his intercession, as though he were already a saint in heaven; fragments of his garments were treasured as relics; he gathered a congregation of beatas and, after mass in his oratory, they would strip off their garments and dance with indecent vigor — drunk with the love of God — and, on some of his female penitents, he would impose the penance of lifting their skirts and exposing themselves before him." Méndez died before the Inquisition could bring him to trial.

Miguel de Molinos was also accused of sympathy owing to some similarities between his book The Spiritual Guide and the teachings of the early , Isabel de la Cruz and Pedro Ruiz de Alcaraz.

A later case happened between the end of the 17th century and the beginning of the 18th century in Tenerife (Canary Islands). This concerned Sister María Justa de Jesús, a Franciscan nun who was accused of practicing Molinist doctrines (a Christian religious doctrine that attempts to reconcile God's providence with human free will). This nun was famous in her day because she was allegedly able to heal the sick by transferring to her person the evils and diseases that afflicted them, in a manner similar to shamans in other cultures. The case was investigated by the Holy Inquisition, and according to its files the nun was accused of being a phony and even a witch. She was also accused of having an improper relationship with her confessor. However, he had many defenders. After her death, the Franciscan Order in the Canary Islands initiated a process of canonization that had to be halted owing to the controversy.

Correction
Their correction, by Inquisitional standards, was not particularly severe. Not all, however, were so fortunate. In 1529 a congregation of naïve adherents at Toledo was subjected to whippings and imprisonment. Greater rigors followed, and for about a century alleged connection with the  sent many to the Inquisition, especially at Córdoba. In spite of this determined action, however, the heresy maintained itself until the middle of the 17th century. The connection of later , whose practices varied in different places, to the original , Isabella de la Cruz and Pedro Ruiz del Alcaraz, is debatable, but the continuing influence of their teachings is not improbable.

of France

A century later, another, more obscure body of  came to light in the south of France in 1722, and appears to have lingered till 1794, having affinities with those known contemporaneously in the United Kingdom as 'French Prophets', an offshoot of the Camisards.

Footnotes

References

Bibliography
 López de Rojas, Gabriel. Sectas y órdenes. Martínez Roca (2007).

External links
 The Alumbrados of Spain

Christian mysticism
Spanish Inquisition
History of Christianity in Spain
History of Christianity in France
Christian mystics
Illuminati